The Liechtenstein National Museum is a museum in Vaduz, the capital city of Liechtenstein.

History
The museum building dated back to 1438. It used to house the princely tavern, custom house and the seat of the government. Work was carried out in 1998–2008 to renovate the building and it was extended towards the mountain slope.

Exhibitions
The museum displays artifacts about the history, culture, nature, and landscape of Liechtenstein in its three buildings and 42 exhibit rooms.

See also
 Kunstmuseum Liechtenstein

References

External links

 

Buildings and structures completed in 1438
Museums with year of establishment missing
Museums in Vaduz
National museums